Li Fung Chang is a Taiwanese communications engineer, since 2015 the chief architect of Taiwan's 5G cellular communications network program office in the Ministry of Economic Affairs (Taiwan), and a chair professor of electrical and computer engineering at National Chiao Tung University.

Education and career
Chang completed a PhD in 1985 at the University of Illinois Urbana-Champaign, with the dissertation An Information-Theoretic Study of Ratio-Threshold Antijam Techniques supervised by coding theorist Robert McEliece. Prior to her current position in Taiwan, she has worked for Telcordia, AT&T Labs, and Broadcom.

Recognition
Chang was named a Fellow of the IEEE in 2001, "for contributions to the design and analysis of radio links and networks for wireless voice/data services".

References

External links
Home page at NCTU

Year of birth missing (living people)
Living people
University of Illinois Urbana-Champaign alumni
Taiwanese electrical engineers
Taiwanese women engineers
Fellow Members of the IEEE